Breakfast is the first meal of the day usually eaten in the morning. The word in English refers to breaking the fasting period of the previous night. Various "typical" or "traditional" breakfast menus exist, with food choices varying by regions and traditions worldwide.

History
The English word "dinner" (from Old French ) also referred originally to breaking a fast; until its meaning shifted in the mid-13th century it was the name given to the first meal of the day. The tradition of eating a morning meal has existed since ancient times, though it was not until the 15th century that "breakfast" came into use in written English as a calque of dinner to describe a morning meal: literally a breaking of the fasting period of the night just ended. In Old English the term had been , literally "morning food."

Ancient breakfast

Ancient Egypt

In Ancient Egypt, peasants ate a daily meal, most likely in the morning, consisting of soup, beer, bread, and onions before they left for work in the fields or work commanded by the pharaohs.

The traditional breakfast believed to have been cooked in ancient Egypt was fūl (made from fava beans, possibly the ancestor of today's ful medames), baladi bread, made from emmer wheat, and falafel, and a mixture of fava beans with onions, garlic, parsley and coriander.

Ancient Greece

The Iliad notes this meal with regard to a labor-weary woodsman eager for a light repast to start his day, preparing it even as he is aching with exhaustion. The opening prose of the 16th book of the Odyssey mentions breakfast as the meal being prepared in the morning before attending to one's chores. Eventually  was moved to around noon, and a new morning meal was introduced.

In the post-Homeric classical period of Greece, a meal called  was typically consumed immediately after rising in the morning.  consisted of barley bread dipped in wine, sometimes complemented by figs or olives. Athenaeus in his Deipnosophistae mentions  topped with honey, sesame and cheese.

Ancient Rome

Romans called breakfast . It was usually composed of everyday staples like bread, cheese, olives, salad, nuts, raisins, and cold meat left over from the night before. It seems unlikely that any fixed time was truly assigned for this meal.

Middle Ages (500–1500)

Europe

In the European Middle Ages, breakfast was not usually considered a necessary and important meal, and was practically nonexistent during the earlier medieval period. Monarchs and their entourages would spend a lot of time around a table for meals. Only two formal meals were eaten per day—one at mid-day and one in the evening. The exact times varied by period and region, but this two-meal system remained consistent throughout the Middle Ages.

Breakfast in some times and places was solely granted to children, the elderly, the sick, and to working men. Anyone else did not speak of or partake in eating in the morning. Eating breakfast meant that one was poor, was a low-status farmer or laborer who truly needed the energy to sustain his morning's labor, or was too weak to make it to the large, midday dinner.

In the 13th century, breakfast when eaten sometimes consisted of a piece of rye bread and a bit of cheese. Morning meals would not include any meat, and would likely include  of low alcohol-content beers. Uncertain quantities of bread and ale could have been consumed in between meals.

By the 15th century, breakfast in western Europe often included meat. By this time, noble men were seen to indulge in breakfast, making it more of a common practice, and by the early 16th century, recorded expenses for breakfast became customary. Breakfast in eastern Europe remained mostly the same as the modern day: a "continental breakfast". The 16th century introduction of caffeinated beverages into the European diet was also an addition to breakfast, believed that coffee and tea aid the body in "evacuation of superfluities".

Modern breakfast (1500–present)

Africa

Traditionally, the various cuisines of Africa use a combination of locally available fruits, cereal grains and vegetables, as well as milk and meat products. In some parts of the continent, the traditional diet features milk, curd and whey products. A type of porridge is most commonly eaten. In the book The Bible cyclopædia (et al.) published in 1843, it was documented that during this time in the Arab world, Bedouins often utilized locusts mixed with butter for breakfast, spreading the mixture on unleavened bread.

Egypt 

In the book The Bible cyclopædia (et al.) published in 1843, it was documented that Egyptians were early risers that sometimes had a first meal consisting of coffee along with the smoking of a pipe, and did not eat breakfast until noon. At this time, it was documented that Egyptian breakfast foods included bread, cheese, eggs, butter, curds, clotted cream and stewed beans. In addition, fava beans are an established national breakfast dish.

Asia

Middle East 
In the Middle East region of Asia,  refers to the evening meal when Muslims break their  (fast) during the Islamic month of Ramadan.  is one of the religious observances of Ramadan, and is often done as a community, with people gathering to break their fast together.  is done right after  (sunset) time. The meal is eaten before  (dawn).

Israel

Japan 

In Japan, it is common to eat miso soup and rice porridge for breakfast.

Lebanon 

In the book The Bible cyclopædia (et al.) it was documented that c. 1843, poor Lebanese people would consume raw leeks with bread for breakfast.

Europe

Austria 

The croissant appears to have originated in Vienna, Austria, in 1683.

France 

French breakfasts are often similar to the continental breakfast. French breakfast pastries include apple turnovers, brioche, croissant and pain au chocolat. Croissants have been described as becoming a standard fare in French breakfast cuisine by 1875.

Netherlands 

Breakfast usually consists of bread with a wide variety of cold cuts, cheeses and sweet toppings; such as hagelslag, vlokken, muisjes, chocolate spread, treacle (a thick, dark brown sugar syrup called stroop), apple butter and peanut butter.

The word waffle derives from the Dutch word , which itself derives from the Middle Dutch , and is likely the origin of the food as it is known today.

United Kingdom 

In the early 16th century, some physicians warned against eating breakfast, because they said it was not healthy to eat before a prior meal was digested. By the 1550s, however, there were multiple sources that claimed breakfast was an important meal. For example, in 1551, Thomas Wingfield stated that breakfast was essential. In 1589, Thomas Cogan stated that it was unhealthy to miss breakfast in the morning. He was one of the first to claim that it was healthy for those who were not young, ill or elders to eat breakfast.

The full breakfast is a staple of British cuisine, and typically consists of bacon, sausages and eggs, often served with a variety of side dishes and a beverage such as coffee or tea. Prior to 1600, breakfast in Great Britain typically included bread, cold meat or fish, and ale. Tea, chocolate and coffee were introduced to Great Britain in the mid-1600s, and in the 1700s coffee and chocolate were adopted as breakfast drinks by the fashionable. Tea eventually became more popular than chocolate as a breakfast drink.

North America

The first groups known to have produced maple syrup and maple sugar were indigenous peoples living in the northeastern part of North America. According to aboriginal oral traditions, as well as archaeological evidence, maple tree sap was being processed into syrup long before Europeans arrived in the region.

Canada 

While it has been a source of controversy where the lumberjack breakfast came from, the most cited source is that the lumberjack breakfast was first served in a Vancouver hotel, in 1870. The breakfast consisted of eggs, assorted fried pork strips, and flapjacks. It is said by Anita Stewart that the tradition of hearty cooking developed because of men needing the energy for manual labor.

Mexico 

A typical Aztec breakfast often included corn porridge with honey and chillies, or tortillas with beans and salsa.

Chilaquiles are a staple breakfast dish that dates back to the times of the Aztecs; they consist of tortilla chips (locally known as "totopos") slathered in salsa and usually come with a side of refried beans. Depending on the region or person, they may be eaten with fried or scrambled eggs, pulled chicken, sprinkled cheese, crema, diced onion, or chopped cilantro (coriander) leaves. Eggs are also a staple in Mexican breakfasts, scrambled and fried eggs are usually eaten with tortillas, salsa, and beans; local varieties include huevos rancheros and "huevos con tortilla," which are scrambled eggs fried alongside pieces of corn tortillas.

Breakfast cereals are also common in Mexico, mainly due to American influence. Health concerns have arisen regarding the nutritional quality of processed breakfast cereal; it is estimated that Mexican preschoolers consume 7% of their total energy intake from processed breakfast cereals and that 6% of Mexican children exclusively have ready-to-eat cereals with milk for breakfast.

United States 

In 1620, waffles were first introduced to North America by pilgrims who had lived in the Netherlands. Later pioneers consumed largely cornmeal-based breakfasts, and would also consume meals such as oatmeal for dinner and lunch. Common breakfast products included corn pone, johnnycakes, ashcakes, hoe-cakes, and corn dodgers. Ashcakes consisted of cornmeal wrapped in cabbage leaves cooked in the ashes of a campfire, while corn pone is baked, corn dodgers are pan fried, and hoe-cakes are similar to pancakes. After the American Civil War, it became fairly common in America to eat sandwiches that were made of ham and eggs. These sandwiches were not strictly consumed in the morning. In 1897, the first true breakfast sandwich recipe was published in a cookbook.
Popcorn cereal was consumed by Americans in the 1800s, which typically consisted of popcorn with milk and a sweetener. Cold breakfast cereal has been consumed by Americans since the late 1890s, and during the 1920s a considerable number of new cereals were marketed. The reason for this movement towards cold breakfast cereals was inspired by the Jacksonian-era Clean Living Movement (1830–1860). This movement focused on a lot of lifestyle changes, but specific to breakfast it claimed that eating bacon, eggs, pancakes and hot coffee was too indulgent. The first prepared cold breakfast cereal marketed to American consumers was created by Dr. John Harvey Kellogg, who introduced it in 1878 and named it granola. The product was prepared with baked wheat, oatmeal and cornmeal, and was the first brand-name breakfast cereal in the United States.

Canned fruit juice became prominent as a breakfast beverage after the discovery of vitamins. C. 1900, orange juice as a breakfast beverage was a new concept. The development of frozen orange juice concentrate began in 1915, and in the 1930s it was produced by several companies. Additionally, mass-produced tomato juice began to be marketed in the mid-1920s, and became a popular breakfast drink a few years thereafter.

Effect on health
While breakfast is commonly referred to as "the most important meal of the day", some contest the positive implications of its "most important" status.

Scientific findings
Some epidemiological research indicates that having breakfast high in rapidly available carbohydrates increases the risk of metabolic syndrome.

Memory was found to be adversely affected in subjects of a study who had not eaten their breakfast (q.v. also Studies using mice under this heading). Intelligence was not affected. Children aged within 8 and 11 years were found to have differing brainwave; EEG activity states, causative to breakfast consumption.  Non-breakfasting children were observed to have higher activity of upper and lower theta wave, alpha wave, and delta wave, which indicated a causative relationship of breakfast consumption to memory function in the subjects.

A review of 47 studies associating breakfast to (i) nutrition, (ii) body weight and (iii) academic performance found amongst those who had eaten breakfast: (i) better nutrition profiles, many studies found less weight (ii) irrespective of greater calorific consumption per day, although a number didn't find this correlation, (iii) studies suggested a possible link to better academic performance in the breakfast eating groups (q.v. Benton and Parker 1998, under this heading).

The influence of breakfast on managing body weight is unclear.

Study using mice
The expression of hippocampal genes that mediate the function or non function of memory was affected to the detriment in mouse subjects not having consumed breakfast for a consistent time.

Healthy choice
Present professional opinion is largely in favor of eating breakfast, but skipping breakfast might be better than eating unhealthy foods.

Gallery

See also

 Breakfast by country
 Breakfast television
 Brunch
 Food history
 Index of breakfast-related articles
 Instant breakfast
 List of breakfast beverages
 List of breakfast foods
 List of food and beverage museums
 Midnight breakfast
 Timeline of food
 Wedding breakfast

References

Bibliography
 
 Goodhugh, William; Cooke Taylor, William (editors) (1843). The Bible cyclopædia: or, Illustrations of the civil and natural history of the sacred writings. Oxford University.
 Sivulka, Juliann (2011). Soap, Sex, and Cigarettes: A Cultural History of American Advertising. Cengage Learning.

Further reading

 
 History of breakfast
 Breakfast: A History. 
 The English Breakfast: The Biography of a National Meal, with Recipes. 
 Eating History: Thirty Turning Points in the Making of American Cuisine. 
 Food and Cooking in Victorian England: A History. 
 Cuisine and Culture: A History of Food and People. 
 Ency Kitchen History  (scroll down in preview)
 A History of Food. 
 Southern Food: At Home, on the Road, in History. 
 Internal Cleansing, Revised 2nd Edition. 
 Corn Meal for Breakfast, Dinner, Supper. 
 Albala, Ken (2008). Pancake: A Global History. Reaktion Books.
 History of breakfast cereal
Handbook of Cereal Science and Technology. 
 Chemistry and Technology of Cereals as Food and Feed. 
 An Uncommon History of Common Things. 
 An Irresistible History of Southern Food: Four Centuries of Black Eyed Peas, Collard Greens, and Whole Hog Barbecue. 
 Foods and Nutrition Encyclopedia, Volume 1. 
 Other sources
 Joie de Vivre: Simple French Style for Everyday Living. .